The 1916–17 Washington State Cougars men's basketball team represented Washington State University in intercollegiate basketball during the 1916–17 season. The team finished the season with a 25–1 record and was retroactively named the national champion by the Helms Athletic Foundation and the Premo-Porretta Power Poll. Ivan Price and Roy Bohler (Fred's younger brother and captain of the team) were named to the All-Pacific Coast Conference team at the end of the season.

Schedule and results

|-
!colspan=9 style="background:#981E32; color:#FFFFFF;"| Regular season

Source

References

Washington State Cougars men's basketball seasons
NCAA Division I men's basketball tournament championship seasons
Washington State
Washington State Cougars Men's Basketball Team
Washington State Cougars Men's Basketball Team